Nelle is a given name, and may refer to:

Nelle Benson, fictional character from General Hospital, an American soap opera on the ABC network
Nelle G. Burger (1869-1957), American temperance leader
Nelle A. Coley (born 1909), a noted educator from Greensboro, NC
Nelle Richmond Eberhart (1871–1944), American librettist, poet, and teacher
Nelle Isabel Law (1914–1990), generally known as Nel Law, Australian artist, poet and diarist
Nelle Harper Lee (1926–2016), or Harper Lee, American novelist widely known for To Kill a Mockingbird
Nelle Lee, Brisbane-based actress, producer and writer best known for theatre work
Nelle Morton (1905–1987), American theologian, professor, feminist activist, and civil rights leader
Nelle Nugent (born 1939), American independent Broadway producer
Nelle Peters (1884–1974), one of Kansas City's most prolific architects, designing a wide range of buildings there
Nelle Porter, fictional character on the Fox television show Ally McBeal
Rhoda-Nelle Rader (1920–2016), wife of Edward Nassour, the American film producer, businessman, and special effects animator
Nelle Wilson Reagan (1883–1962), the mother of United States President Ronald Reagan and his older brother Neil "Moon" Reagan
Nelle Scanlan MBE (1882–1968), New Zealand journalist and novelist
Nelle Brooke Stull of Elyria, Ohio, founder and president of the Widows' & Widowers' Club
Lou Nelle Sutton (1905–1994), businesswoman and former state representative from San Antonio, Texas

See also
Van Nelle Factory on the Schie in Rotterdam, a prime example of the International Style based upon constructivist architecture
Nelle Brown Memorial Library, 166 West Liberty Street, Lyons, Georgia, a branch of the Ohoopee Regional Library System
Lange Nelle Lighthouse, lighthouse in Oostende, Flanders, Belgium
Nele
Nell
Nelles